The United States House Natural Resources Subcommittee on Fisheries, Wildlife, Oceans and Insular Affairs was one of the five subcommittees within the  House Natural Resources Committee.  Its purview has been split between two successor subcommittees: the Subcommittee on Indian, Insular and Alaska Native Affairs, and the Subcommittee on Water, Power and Oceans.

At the beginning of the 114th Congress, Rep. Rob Bishop of Utah became the new Chairman of the House Natural Resources Committee.  He reorganized the committee's structure, eliminated this Subcommittee, and split its duties between the Subcommittee on Indian, Insular and Alaska Native Affairs, and the Subcommittee on Water, Power and Oceans.

Members, 113th Congress

External links 
 Official site

Natural Resources